Dish-bearers (often called seneschals by historians) and butlers (or cup-bearers) were thegns who acted as personal attendants of kings in Anglo-Saxon England. Royal feasts played an important role in consolidating community and hierarchy among the elite, and dish-bearers and butlers served the food and drinks at these meals. Thegns were members of the aristocracy, leading landowners who occupied the third lay (non-religious) rank in English society after the king and ealdormen. Dish-bearers and butlers probably also carried out diverse military and administrative duties as required by the king. Some went on to have illustrious careers as ealdormen, but most never rose higher than thegn.

Etymology
The chief attendants at Anglo-Saxon royal feasts were dish-bearers and butlers or cup-bearers. The French medievalist Alban Gautier states: "Both  and  literally mean 'dish-bearer', but in the first case 'dish' should be understood as the disc-shaped object, whereas in the second it refers to the culinary preparation that was inside." Historians often translate  as seneschal, but Gautier objects that the word seneschal is not recorded in England before the Norman Conquest. According to the twelfth-century chronicler, John of Worcester, in 946 King Edmund I was killed trying to protect his  from assault by an outlaw. The editors of John's chronicle translate  as "steward", but the historian Ann Williams prefers "seneschal".

Role
Royal feasts played an important part in consolidating community and hierarchy in the Anglo-Saxon elite. Dish-bearers and cup-bearers (butlers), who served at the table, played a major role in helping to make them political successes. Some feasts were compulsory drinking parties, such as the dinner held by Bishop Æthelwold at Abingdon for King Eadred in about 954: the King ordered that the mead should flow plentifully, the doors were locked so that no one could leave, and Northumbrian thegns in the King's entourage got drunk. There may have been teams of dish-bearers and butlers, under the supervision of two of them. They were probably versatile servants of the king, who carried out diverse administrative and military duties as required.

In the early 990s, when King Æthelred the Unready had several infant children, Æfic was dish-bearer to the æthelings, suggesting that they jointly had a household with one dish-bearer. When they grew up, each would have had their own retinue with a dish-bearer, and probably a butler. In 1014 Æthelred's eldest son Æthelstan left eight hides of land and a horse to his  in his will. The dish-bearer of Æthelstan's younger brother Edmund (the future King Edmund Ironside) attested a charter at a time when Æthelstan was still alive, showing that kings' younger sons also had dish-bearers.

Status
Dish-bearers and butlers had a high status in the hierarchy of the court. The offices were held by thegns, who were the third lay rank of the aristocracy. To be a thegn, a man had to at least be a substantial local landowner, and he could be a major magnate owning estates in several counties. He would be expected to perform military and administrative functions. A few were promoted to ealdorman, the top level of the lay aristocracy below the king. According to the historian Simon Keynes, "collectively, the thegns were the very fabric of social and political order". Kings and ealdormen could exploit their positions, "but in the final analysis it was the thegns who counted". 

The order of attestations in charters was an indication of status, and dish-bearers and butlers usually attested charters above ordinary thegns. No dish-bearer or butler witnessed charters of two successive kings with mention of his office, suggesting that his position was a personal one which ended with the king's death. The butler and dish-bearer of Edith, wife of Edward the Confessor, remained with her when the King died rather than moving to serve the new queen.

History
The main evidence for the posts of dish-bearer and butler is provided by witness lists to charters. The offices may have been copied from the equivalent Frankish offices, but the sources for the early Anglo-Saxon period are few and problematic and the evidence is too limited to be certain. Between 741 and 809  attested charters of Kent, the Hwicce and Mercia, and in 785 Eatta attested a charter of Offa of Mercia as "" (ealdorman and king's dish-bearer), but all later attestations of dish-bearers and butlers are in West Saxon and English charters. In Wessex in the early ninth century, members of great families sought positions as dish-bearers and butlers, and Alfred the Great's maternal grandfather was a famous . In Alfred's own reign, the offices could be a step in an illustrious noble career. Alfred's  in 892, Sigewulf, later became an ealdorman and died fighting against the Vikings at the Battle of the Holme in 902.

In the tenth century, most dish-bearers and butlers were thegns of lesser status who never rose higher, but some members of leading families held the post before becoming ealdormen. Wulfgar and Odda were dish-bearers and leading thegns under King Æthelstan, and were promoted to ealdorman by his successor, Edmund. Under Edward the Confessor, members of the families who held most of the earldoms, those of Godwin and Leofric, did not become dish-bearers or butlers, and the positions may have become less attractive to the greatest aristocrats when they were more powerful than the court. In the 1060s a new rank of staller was created between thegns and earls, and men with this rank could hold the office of dish-bearer.

Notes

References

Sources

 
 
 
 
 
 

 

 

 
 

Anglo-Saxon society
Anglo-Saxon kingdoms